Mansurovo (Mansur) is a rural locality (a village) in Staropetrovsky Selsoviet, Birsky District, Bashkortostan, Russia. The population was 10 as of 2010. There are 2 streets.

Geography 
Mansurovo is located 36 km south of Birsk (the district's administrative centre) by road. Gorny is the nearest rural locality.

References 

Rural localities in Birsky District